Zuoyun County is a county in the north of Shanxi province, China, bordering Inner Mongolia to the north. It is the westernmost county-level division of the prefecture-level city of Datong.

Climate

References

External links
 Homepage

County-level divisions of Shanxi
Datong